Tolosa Club de Fútbol is a Spanish football team based in Tolosa, in the autonomous community of Basque Country. Founded in 1922, it plays in the Tercera División RFEF – Group 4, holding home games at Estadio Beratzubi, with a capacity of 3,000 seats.

Season to season

46 seasons in Tercera División
1 season in Tercera División RFEF

Famous players
 Igor Jauregi

Famous coaches
 Periko Alonso

References

External links
Official website 
División de Honor 

Football clubs in the Basque Country (autonomous community)
Association football clubs established in 1922
Divisiones Regionales de Fútbol clubs
1922 establishments in Spain
Sport in Gipuzkoa